The hojang was a local official of low rank during the Goryeo and Joseon periods of Korean history.  His role was similar to that of a village headman.

The hojang was responsible for maintaining various local records, including the slave rolls and the gijeok register of working kisaeng.

See also
History of Korea
Joseon Dynasty politics

Goryeo
Joseon dynasty